Silveria is a surname. Notable people with the surname include:

 David Silveria (born 1972), American drummer, former drummer for the band Korn
 Jay B. Silveria, United States Air Force lieutenant general, 20th Superintendent of the United States Air Force Academy
 Robert Joseph Silveria Jr. (born 1959), American serial killer